Mundang is an Mbum language of southern Chad and northern Cameroon.

The Gelama dialect of Cameroon may be a separate language.

Distribution
Mundang, spoken in Cameroon by 44,700 speakers (SIL 1982), is mainly spoken in Mayo-Kani department, Far North Region, in the communes of Mindif, Moulvouday, and Kaélé. It is also spoken to a lesser extent in the south of Mayo-Kebi, in the east of Bibemi commune (Bénoué department, Northern Region), towards the Chadian border. Mundang of Lere (in Chad) and Mundang of Cameroon (centered in Lara and Kaélé) are highly similar.

Writing System

Nasalization is marked by a tilde: ã, ẽ, ə̃, ĩ, õ

References

Languages of Chad
Languages of Cameroon
Mbum languages